The 2015 Women's U-19 European Handball Championship was the tenth edition of the European Women's U-19 Handball Championship, held in Valencia, Spain from 23 July to 2 August 2015. Sixteen teams participated on the tournament, including the fifteen qualifying winners and the host nation. Sweden was the defending champions, but didn't reached the final, after getting defeated by Denmark in the semifinals. Denmark won the tournament, with a 29-26 win against Russia.

Qualification

Draw 
The draw was held on 5 May 2015 in Valencia.

Referees

Preliminary round 
All times are local (UTC+2).

Group A

Final round

Bracket 
Championship bracket 

9th place bracket

Seventh place game

Semifinals

Fifth place game

Third place match

Final

Final ranking

All Star Team
The All Star Team and awards were announced on 2 August 2015.

Top goalscorers

References

External links 
 

European Women's U-19 Handball Championship
European Women's U-19 Handball Championship
International handball competitions hosted by Spain
European U-19
European Women's U-19 Handball Championship
Sport in Valencia